The Devon County Football League was a football competition based in England. It consisted of 20 clubs and sat at step 7 (or level 11) of the National League System.

History
The league was formed in 1992 in order to form an intermediate level between local leagues in Devon and the Western League. It took clubs from the Devon & Exeter League, the North Devon League, the Plymouth & District Combination and the South Devon League.

In 2007 it merged with the South Western League to form the South West Peninsula League, which sits at step 6 of the National League System.

List of champions

References

 
1992 establishments in England
2007 disestablishments in England
Football in Devon
Defunct football leagues in England